Thomas Robinson Murray (February 17, 1893 in Buffalo, New York – October 25, 1963) was an American-Canadian professional ice hockey goaltender who played in various professional and amateur leagues, including the Western Canada Hockey League (WCHL) and Pacific Coast Hockey Association (PCHA).

Career
Murray started his amateur career in Winnipeg, Manitoba with the Winnipeg Strathconas of the Manitoba Independent League, in 1912–13. Amongst the professional teams Murray played with were the Portland Rosebuds, Victoria Aristocrats, Vancouver Millionaires, and Saskatoon Crescents. In 1916 he played in the Stanley Cup finals with the Portland Rosebuds losing in five games to the Montreal Canadiens at the Montreal Arena.

Before going professional in the 1915–16 season Murray won the 1915 Allan Cup with the Winnipeg Monarchs as amateur champions of Canada.

After the 1922–23 season Murray was out of hockey for two years but moved back to the west coast where he had spent the majority of his professional career. For the 1925–26 season he joined the Los Angeles Richfields of the California Hockey League where number of old PCHA and WCHL players (such as Moose Johnson, Bernie Morris, Lloyd Cook and Smokey Harris) spent the twilight years of their hockey careers. Murray played for five years with the Los Angeles Richfields and retired in 1930.

1933 Long Beach earthquake
On March 11, 1933, the Winnipeg Tribune published a story ('Tom Murray, hockey player, dies in quake') which claimed Murray was one of the fatally injured victims in the March 10, 1933 Long Beach earthquake south of downtown Los Angeles (which claimed between 115 and 120 lives). His name had however been confused with that of a Los Angeles garage employee named Tommy Murray, as he had escaped the earthquake without injuries.

Murray died in Fontana, California on October 25, 1963.

Statistics

References

External links
Tommy Murray at JustSportsStats

1893 births
1963 deaths
American men's ice hockey goaltenders
Canadian ice hockey goaltenders
Ice hockey people from Buffalo, New York
Portland Rosebuds players
Saskatoon Sheiks players
Ice hockey people from Winnipeg
Vancouver Millionaires players
Victoria Aristocrats players